Elections were held in the Australian state of Queensland between 27 July 1870 and 15 September 1870 to elect the members of the state's Legislative Assembly.

Key dates
Due to problems of distance and communications, it was not possible to hold the elections on a single day.

See also
 Members of the Queensland Legislative Assembly, 1870–1871

References

Elections in Queensland
1870 elections in Australia
1870s in Queensland
July 1870 events
August 1870 events
September 1870 events